Idam Jagath is a 2018 Indian Telugu language film directed by Anil Srikantam and starring Sumanth and Anju Kurian.

Cast 
Sumanth as Nishith 
Anju Kurian as Mahati 
Satya as Anand
Adithya as Dr. Sravan
Vinay Varma as Vikram Simha
Priyadarshini Ram as Rajeev
Vamshi as Vamshi
Kalyan Vitappu as Kalyan Tripati
 Gokul as Narendra Prasad
Sivaji Raja as Police officer
Appaji Ambarisha Darbha as Mahati's father

Production 
The trailer released on 19 December 2018. The film is loosely inspired by Nightcrawler (2014) starring Jake Gyllenhaal.

Soundtrack 
Sricharan Pakala composed the songs for the film.
Dooraale -  Yamini Ghantasala, Raviprakash Chodimala
Manase - (written by VNV Ramesh) Yamini Ghantasala

Release 
The Times of India gave the film two out of five stars and wrote that "Sumanth's act as a man with sketchy ethics is the only thing making this worth it". Similarly, The Hindu wrote, "Barring Sumanth, who gets a role that gives him ample scope to shine, the other characters and performances have nothing much to write about".

References

External links 

2010s Telugu-language films
Films scored by Sricharan Pakala